Pattern calculus bases all computation on pattern matching of a very general kind.  Like lambda calculus, it supports a
uniform treatment of function evaluation. Also, it allows functions to be
passed as arguments and returned as results. In addition, pattern calculus supports
uniform access to the internal structure of arguments, be they pairs
or lists or trees. Also, it allows patterns to be passed as arguments and
returned as results.  Uniform access is illustrated by a
pattern-matching function  that computes the size of an
arbitrary data structure. In the notation of the programming language
bondi, it is given by the recursive function
let rec size = 
 | x y -> (size x) + (size y) 
 | x -> 1 

The second, or default case  matches the pattern 
against the argument and returns .  This
case is used only if the matching failed in the first case.  The
first, or special case matches against any compound, such
as a non-empty list, or pair. Matching binds  to the left component
Then the body of the case adds the
sizes of these components together.

Similar techniques yield generic queries for searching and updating. Combining recursion and decomposition in this way yields path polymorphism.

The ability to pass patterns as parameters (pattern polymorphism) is illustrated by defining a 
generic eliminator.  Suppose given constructors  for creating
counters. The corresponding eliminators are then
elimLeaf  = |  Leaf y -> y 
elimCount = | Count y -> y

These examples can be produced by applying the generic eliminator
 to the constructors in question. It is defined by
elim = | x -> | {y} x y -> y 

In general, the curly braces  contain the bound variables of the

External links

Archive mirror of the links below (which are no longer online)
 — the original paper, but not most general.

bondi programming language research site

Lambda calculus